The 2006–07 NCAA Division I men's ice hockey season began in = October 2006 and ended with the 2007 NCAA Division I men's ice hockey tournament's championship game on April 7, 2007, at the Scottrade Center in St. Louis, Missouri. Michigan State won the NCAA Division I Men's Ice Hockey Championship, defeating Boston College 3–1 in the national championship game. This was the 60th season in which an NCAA ice hockey championship was held and is the 113th year overall where an NCAA school fielded a team.

Pre-season polls

The top 20 from USCHO.com/CSTV and the top 15 from USA Today/USA Hockey Magazine.

Regular season

Season tournaments

Standings

2007 NCAA tournament

Note: * denotes overtime period(s)

Player stats

Scoring leaders
The following players led the league in points at the conclusion of the season.

  
GP = Games played; G = Goals; A = Assists; Pts = Points; PIM = Penalty minutes

Leading goaltenders
The following goaltenders led the league in goals against average at the end of the regular season while playing at least 33% of their team's total minutes.

GP = Games played; Min = Minutes played; W = Wins; L = Losses; OT = Overtime/shootout losses; GA = Goals against; SO = Shutouts; SV% = Save percentage; GAA = Goals against average

Awards

NCAA

Atlantic Hockey

CCHA

CHA

ECAC

Hockey East

WCHA

See also
 2006–07 NCAA Division III men's ice hockey season

References

External links
USCHO.com 

 
NCAA